is a station on the Tokyo Monorail in Ōta, Tokyo, Japan.

Lines
Only all-stations "Local" services stop at this station.

Station layout
The station has two island platforms serving four tracks. The platforms are connected by underpass with entrances and ticket barriers on the east and west sides of the station.

Platforms

Local trains normally use platforms 1 and 4 to allow non-stop Haneda Express trains to pass.

Adjacent stations

History
The station opened as an unmanned station on 7 February 1985 beside Shōwajima Depot, initially for use by depot staff and workers in nearby factories around the area. From 19 June 1992, all Local trains began stopping at Shōwajima Station, and the station became fully staffed from 28 September 2000. The passing loops at the station were brought into use from 18 March 2007, allowing non-stop trains to pass here.

Passenger statistics
In fiscal 2011, the station was used by an average of 4,411 passengers daily.

Surrounding area
 Showajima Maintenance Depot

References

External links

 Tokyo Monorail station information 

Tokyo Monorail Haneda Line
Stations of Tokyo Monorail
Railway stations in Tokyo
Railway stations in Japan opened in 1985